Sir William Norris (6 July 1795 – 7 September 1859) was the seventh Chief Justice of Ceylon and seventh Advocate Fiscal of Ceylon.

He was born in London, the son of William Norris, who was President of the Royal College of Surgeons in 1824, and his wife, Hannah Phillips. He was baptised in Bray, Berkshire at two weeks old. He studied law at the Middle Temple and was called to the bar in 1827. He moved to India in 1829 to practice there.

He was knighted by letters patent in 1835 and appointed a puisne judge in Ceylon. He was promoted to Chief Justice of Ceylon on 27 April 1836, succeeding Charles Marshall, holding the post until 1837. He was succeeded by Anthony Oliphant. Norris was appointed despite William Rough having served on the bench since 1831, as acting puisne justice, senior puisne justice and as acting chief justice.

His son was the author William Edward Norris. His daughter Anne Grace Norris married the future Governor Arthur Havelock.

References

1859 deaths
Members of the Middle Temple
Chief Justices of British Ceylon
20th-century Sri Lankan people
19th-century Sri Lankan people
Sri Lankan people of English descent
British expatriates in Sri Lanka
19th-century British people
Puisne Justices of the Supreme Court of Ceylon
Attorneys General of British Ceylon
Knights Bachelor
British Ceylon judges
1795 births
British people in colonial India